Daljit Singh (born 1940–1941) is an Indian former first-class cricketer and pitch curator. He played for various teams during his career from 1961/62 to 1978/79. After his playing career, he became a pitch curator and chairman of the grounds and pitches committee of the Board of Control for Cricket in India.

Life and career
Singh was a wicket-keeper batsman who appeared in 87 first-class and 3 List A matches. The teams he represented include Services, Northern Punjab, Delhi, Bihar, North Zone and East Zone. He was a prolific wicket-keeper and batsman, effecting more than 200 dismissals and scoring close to 4000 runs. He was working for the Indian Navy when he started his cricket career with Services. He played for Bihar for 12 seasons and also captained them to 1975–76 Ranji Trophy final.

Singh was employed with Tata Steel in Jamshedpur during his career with Bihar. He worked for one year at 10 Janpath, where he prepared a cricket pitch inside the residence of the Indian Prime Minister Lal Bahadur Shastri for Shastri's son who was interested in cricket. He worked for 22 years with Tata Steel as chief of community and rural development services, before being employed for three years in Bangalore by an NGO. During his stay in Bangalore he coached the likes of Rahul Dravid, Anil Kumble, Javagal Srinath and Venkatesh Prasad. He was then offered a coaching role with the Punjab team as well as a role with the under-construction stadium in Mohali by the Punjab Cricket Association (PCA) secretary I. S. Bindra.

He has been the curator of Mohali's PCA Stadium for over 20 years. He was a member of BCCI's first Pitch Committee that was formed in 1997. He worked as the chairman of the Board of Control for Cricket in India (BCCI) grounds and pitches committee but was sacked in December 2009 after an ODI at Delhi was called off with the match referee declaring the pitch "dangerous" and unsuitable for play. He became the chairman of BCCI's grounds and pitches committee again, and holds the position as of December 2015.

References

External links
 
 

Living people
Date of birth missing (living people)
Indian cricketers
Services cricketers
Southern Punjab cricketers
Delhi cricketers
Bihar cricketers
North Zone cricketers
East Zone cricketers
Indian cricket coaches
1940s births